Alspach's conjecture is a mathematical theorem that characterizes the disjoint cycle covers of complete graphs with prescribed cycle lengths. It is named after Brian Alspach, who posed it as a research problem in 1981.

Formulation
In this context, a disjoint cycle cover is a set of simple cycles, no two of which use the same edge, that include all of the edges of a graph. For a disjoint cycle cover to exist, it is necessary for every vertex to have even degree, because the degree of each vertex is two times the number of cycles that include that vertex, an even number. And for the cycles in a disjoint cycle cover to have a given collection of lengths,
it is also necessary for the sum of the given cycle lengths to equal the total number of edges in the given graph. It is this statement that Bryant, Horsley, and Pettersson proved.

Generalization to even numbers of vertices
In this case the matching eliminates the odd degree at each vertex, leaving a subgraph of even degree, and the remaining condition is again that the sum of the cycle lengths equals the number of edges to be covered. This variant of the conjecture was also proven by Bryant, Horsley, and Pettersson.

Related problems
The Oberwolfach problem on decompositions of complete graphs into copies of a given 2-regular graph is related, but neither is a special case of the other.

References

Theorems in graph theory
Conjectures that have been proved